Old Main, constructed in 1907–1908, is a historic building at Dakota College at Bottineau (previously named Minot State University–Bottineau), a two-year college in Bottineau, North Dakota. The building previously housed the North Dakota School of Forestry. The building is listed in the National Register of Historic Places.

History
In 1889, the North Dakota legislature desired to build a forestry school. Bottineau was chosen as the location in 1894. The state legislative assembly raised $25,000 in 1907, then commissioned architect Joseph Shannon for the building, completed in 1908. The school was constructed in the Romanesque Revival style. The school's campus expanded over the years, but the original building kept its nickname of Old Main.

Current status
A new addition has been constructed at Dakota College at Bottineau (then called Minot State University–Bottineau) and Old Main will be left vacant. People at the college are looking at ways to maintain the building and put it to a new use. It will be left vacant and minimally heated after faculty have moved into the new addition in August 2007. The building is considered endangered by Preservation North Dakota.

Notes

School buildings completed in 1908
University and college buildings on the National Register of Historic Places in North Dakota
Minot State University-Bottineau
Romanesque Revival architecture in North Dakota
National Register of Historic Places in Bottineau County, North Dakota
1908 establishments in North Dakota
Education in Bottineau County, North Dakota